The 12th Pan American Games were held in Mar del Plata, Argentina from March 11 to March 26, 1995.

Medals

Silver

Men's Points Race (Track): Milton Wynants

Bronze

Men's Individual Time Trial (Road): Servando Figueredo

Results by event

Athletics
Juan Silva
Ricardo Vera

Basketball

Men's team competition
Preliminary round
Defeated Mexico (92-78)
Lost to Argentina (81-83)
Lost to Brazil (83-107)
Lost to United States (96-104)
Defeated Puerto Rico (101-76)
Semi-Finals
Lost to Argentina (74-90)
Bronze Medal Match
Lost to Brazil (86-90) → 4th place
Team roster
Marcel Bouzout
Gonzalo Caneiro
Marcelo Capalbo
Federico Garcín
Jeffrey Granger
Adrián Laborda
Diego Losada
Alain Mayor
Oscar Moglia Jr.
Gustavo Sczygielski
Luis Silveira
Luis Pierri
Head coach: Victor Berardi

Cycling
Gregorio Bare
Fernando Britos
Gustavo Figueredo
Sergio Tesitore
Milton Wynants

Swimming
Javier Golovchenko

Rowing
Norberto Alvarez
Gianfranco Percovich
Jesús Posse
Daniel Salvagno
Ruben Scarpatti
Marcelo Trigo

Taekwondo
Julio Carbajal

Tennis
Claudia Brause
Marcelo Filippini
Diego Pérez

See also
 Sport in Uruguay
 Uruguay at the 1996 Summer Olympics

References
Uruguay Olympic Committee

Nations at the 1995 Pan American Games
P
1995